Kościelec  is a village in the administrative district of Gmina Proszowice, within Proszowice County, Lesser Poland Voivodeship, in southern Poland.

The village has a population of 540 in 2009.

In the centre of the village is situated the church of Saint Adalbert of Prague (św.Wojciech in polish). It was founded in 1231 by the bishop of Kraków, Wisław Zabawa. The church is Romanesque in origin but rebuilt and restored many times, notably in the Baroque style.

References

Villages in Proszowice County